Cerjani is a village in Kaštelir-Labinci municipality in Istria County, Croatia.

References

Populated places in Istria County